"Devuélveme a mi chica" (Spanish for "Give me back my girl") the debut single by the Spanish pop rock band, Hombres G. It originally appeared on their debut studio album, Hombres G (1985).

The song was released as a single and was commercially successful. It was also an international hit. It is one of the group's most popular songs and remains significant in the genres of rock en español and 1980s Spanish music, being ranked among VH1's "Las 100 + Grandiosas Canciones En Español".

The song is popularly known as "Sufre, mamón", due to the chorus catchphrase.

Over time, the song has become a Spanish 80's classic, keeping its popularity through the years in countries such as Mexico, where the song has been in the streaming charts for five years, making it the most successful song from the group and the most streamed song by a Spanish band in the country. It has also charted in Peru, Colombia, Bolivia and Ecuador, among others.

The song went viral in early mid-2022 after becoming massively successful on TikTok in Spain and Latin America.

Lyrical content

The song's narrator describes the dread he feels as he witnesses the romantic encounter between a girl and a boy. The boy travels in a white Ford Fiesta and wears a yellow jersey; the narrator derides him as preppy and a sissy ("pijo" and "marica" in Spanish, respectively). The narrator demands that the boy return his "chick" or that otherwise he will fall victim to "polvos picapica"

The narrator proceeds to burn the boy's jersey. To his dismay, the boy buys five or six more. Consequently, the narrator makes plans to destroy the boy's car. He announces that the boy will die and that the girl will return to him.

The lyrics of the song have been described as defying the cliché model of masculinity. Instead of chronicling a violent and physical encounter, the narrator uses an unexpected and mischievous method to take revenge: itchy powders.

Release
The song was originally released as a single in Spain, in 1985. When it was released internationally, it faced scrutiny because of its lyrics, and was partially censored in México. The lyrics include the word "mamón" (literally "sucker") which in Mexico is quite offensive (much stronger than "jerk"). Therefore, an edited version for the radio was released. The phrasing was then changed to "sufre, sufre".

Track listing
Devuélveme a mi chica

Chart positions

Personnel
Hombres G

 David Summers - lead vocals, bass
 Rafa Gutierrez - guitar
 Daniel Mezquita - guitar
 Javier Molina - drums

Notes

References

External links
 Official site
 Discography
 Hombres G: Albums, Songs, Bios, Photos at Amazon.com

1985 singles
Hombres G songs
Number-one singles in Spain
1985 songs